Per Strand Hagenes (born 10 July 2003) is a Norwegian road cyclist, who has also competed in cross-country skiing. He currently rides for UCI Continental team . In 2021 he won a silver medal at road race of the European Junior Championships, and became World Junior Champion, winning the gold medal of the road race in Leuven, Belgium. He had already been two times national Junior Champion in road race as well, in 2020 and 2021; and time trial Junior Champion in 2020.

Major results

2020
 National Junior Road Championships
1st  Road race
1st  Time trial
2021
 1st  Road race, UCI Junior Road World Championships
 National Junior Road Championships
1st  Road race
2nd Time trial
 UEC European Junior Road Championships
2nd  Road race
6th Time trial
 1st  Overall Course de la Paix Juniors
1st Stage 3
 1st  Overall One Belt One Road
1st Prologue & Stage 2
 2nd Overall Aubel–Thimister–Stavelot
1st Stage 2b
 3rd Paris–Roubaix Juniors
2022
 1st Paris–Tours Espoirs
 1st Stage 2 Oberösterreich Rundfahrt
 2nd Overall Le Triptyque des Monts et Chateaux
1st  Points classification
1st  Young rider classification
1st Stage 3b
 3rd Giro del Belvedere
2023
 1st Ronde van Drenthe

References

External links
 Per Strand Hagenes at Cycling Archives
 Per Strand Hagenes at ProCyclingStats

2003 births
Living people
Norwegian male cyclists